Alumni Memorial Gymnasium is a building on the East Campus of Duke University in Durham, North Carolina, that opened in 1923. A 31,000 square foot addition to the facility, featuring a pool, indoor track, basketball courts, and aerobics and weight rooms, named the Keith and Brenda Brodie Recreation Center, was completed in 1996. 

Opened in 1923, the gymnasium was home to the Duke Blue Devils men's basketball (known until 1924 as the Trinity Blue Devils) from 1924 to 1930. There was room for 1,400 fans downstairs and 600 spectators on the upstairs balcony for basketball games. The basketball team moved into Card Gymnasium in 1930.

References

Defunct college basketball venues in the United States
Duke Blue Devils men's basketball
1923 establishments in North Carolina
Sports venues completed in 1923